Brazeal Dennard (January 1, 1929 – July 5, 2010) was an American singer, educator, Choral director, and musical arranger.  He has been a significant contributor in the preservation and revitalization of the spiritual musical form.  His efforts helped moved the African-American spiritual beyond the confines of the church, exposing not only the beauty of this music, but also its historical importance to a wider audience.

Biography
Born in Detroit at just prior to the Great Depression, Dennard acquired an early love of music and began playing piano at age 11.  He attended Detroit Public Schools and moved on to Wayne State University  where he received a Master of Arts degree in Music Education.  While in the U.S. armed services, he organized a choral group of enlisted men and their wives..

While a teacher in the Detroit Public schools, Dennard held the position of Fine Arts Department Head at Northwestern High School and Director of Music Education  He retired from this position in 1989.

Throughout his career, Dennard served in many roles, including guest conductor, clinician, lecturer, and church choirmaster. His numerous professional affiliations included the National Endowment of the Arts, Department of Cultural Affairs for the city of Detroit, trustee and member of the Advisory Committee of the Detroit Community Music School, Chairman of the Music Advisory Committee for the Michigan Council for the Arts, President of the National Association of Negro Musicians, member of the Board of Directors of the Detroit Symphony Orchestra, and Adjunct Faculty member at Wayne State University .

In 1972 he founded the  Brazeal Dennard Chorale, a group of highly trained singers dedicated to developing the choral art to its highest professional level.  In keeping with his lifelong interest in education, the Chorale sponsors two other choral groups, The Brazeal Dennard Community Chorus - organized in 1985 as a community outreach program to encourage participation of members of the surrounding communities and to provide them with vocal training and professional performance opportunities, and The Brazeal Dennard Youth Chorale - for singers between the ages of 13 and 22.

Discography

Recordings of the Brazeal Dennard Chorale include:

 Remembering, Discovering, Preserving
 Hush
 In Silent Night
 Bridging Generations
 Remembering II: Significant Spirituals

1929 births
2010 deaths
American choral conductors
American male conductors (music)
20th-century American conductors (music)
21st-century American conductors (music)
Musicians from Detroit
Wayne State University alumni
Wayne State University faculty
Classical musicians from Michigan
20th-century American male musicians
21st-century American male musicians